Ayako Shoda (正田 絢子 Shōda Ayako, born November 3, 1981) is a female wrestler from Japan.

Awards
Tokyo Sports
Wrestling Special Award (1999, 2005)

References

External links
 
 bio on fila-wrestling.com

Living people
1981 births
Japanese female sport wrestlers
World Wrestling Championships medalists
Universiade medalists in wrestling
Universiade gold medalists for Japan
Medalists at the 2005 Summer Universiade
Asian Wrestling Championships medalists
21st-century Japanese women